Mount Scott is a small stratovolcano and a so-called parasitic cone on the southeast flank of Crater Lake in southern Oregon. It is approximately 420,000 years old. Its summit is the highest point within Crater Lake National Park, and the tenth highest peak in the Oregon Cascades.
A small fire lookout tower stands on the summit, at the end of a trail that zigzags approximately 1,500 feet (460 m) up the mountain. The mountain is named for Oregon pioneer Levi Scott, founder of Scottsburg, Oregon.

Geology
Mount Scott first erupted about 420,000 years ago and is one of the oldest volcanoes in the Mount Mazama complex.
It erupted mainly andesitic lavas before becoming extinct in the late Pleistocene.
Since it was relatively far away from the main flanks of Mount Mazama, it survived the mountain's massive explosion that occurred around 5700 BC.
Most of the lower slopes are covered with ash, pumice, and loose gravel, while the  summit is mostly covered with scoria.

Flora
Many species of plants inhabit the slopes of Mount Scott. The most common species of trees include Douglas fir, white pine, hemlock,  whitebark pine, lodgepole pine. Wildflowers, such as Indian paintbrush, penstemon, forget-me-nots, wild onions, and buttercups can be found on the mountain.

Trail
There is one trail to the summit of Mount Scott. It has many switchbacks, and ends at the fire lookout tower on the summit.

Panoramic views of Crater Lake can be seen from the summit. Mount Thielsen, Diamond Peak, Mount McLoughlin, Mount Shasta, Upper Klamath Lake, and Diamond Lake are other landmarks that can be seen from the summit.

References

External links

 
  

Stratovolcanoes of the United States
Cascade Range
Volcanoes of Oregon
Mountains of Oregon
Subduction volcanoes
Cascade Volcanoes
Highest points of United States national parks
Crater Lake National Park
Parasitic cones
Mountains of Klamath County, Oregon
Volcanoes of Klamath County, Oregon
Pleistocene stratovolcanoes